PilotsEYE.tv is a German documentary series, which provides a detailed insight into the cockpit of airliners. The films are produced by AignerMEDIA ( AME ) GmbH under the direction of Thomas Aigner. The documentary series is aimed at ordinary passengers and flight enthusiasts due to recording the everyday work of the pilot by using several high definition cameras.

Content

The viewer gets an overview of data for refueling, flight time, flight status and type of aircraft. Pre-flight preparations, procedures for push back, taxiing, takeoff, as well as approach and landing are shown in detail during recordings from the cockpit together with some exteriors and recordings from the control tower. During the flight, only selected scenes are shown, for example, crew change, route changes or interesting views from the window. The pilots explain aspects of their work and provide insights into the functions of the aircraft.

List of episodes

References

External links
 
PilotsEYE.tv Production website
HD-Trailer on YouTube
Backstage on Facebook
Video on demand on Vimeo

Aviation websites
Documentary television series about aviation
2007 web series debuts
German travel websites
Travel web series